The Tikal–Calakmul wars were a series of wars between Tikal and Calakmul. The First Tikal–Calakmul War was the  first of these wars. During this and following conflicts in Petén vassal states like Naranjo and Dos Pilas were often used. Though Yaxchilan was in the war it only had a minor presence at the beginning.

Yaxchilan and Calakmul

In 537 the Ajaws of Bonampak, Lakamtuun, and Calakmul (Calakmul) were captured by Yaxchilan. Bonampak and Lakamtuun remained under the control of Yaxchilan but in retaliation Calakmul conquered the latter. This gave the polity a strategic position with territory in both the east and the west of Tikal.

Calakmul was the largest Classic Maya city ever, containing around 6,500 buildings in the initial 30 square kilometre area. The population density in the urban core may have been 1,000/km2. Greater Calakmul, consisting of around 122 km2, probably had a density of around 420/km2. Together this would count for a total urban population of 50,000 inhabitants. Twenty secondary sites were found within the Calakmul kingdom, raising the population to around 200,000. There appear to have been smaller third- and fourth-level sites. When all populations are summed up, the total population of the Calakmul Kingdom may have been between 1.5 and 1.75 million people. This appears to be a larger population than the kingdom of Tikal.

All-out war
By 546 (9.5.11.11.18 on the Maya calendar) Naranjo had been conquered by Calakmul; during this time  Aj Wosal was appointed ruler of Naranjo.

In 561 (9.6.6.15.17) the ruler known as Sky Witness was crowned at Los Alcranes. His reign began the Kaan dynasty in Calakmul.

Sky Witness played a major role in the politics of the Maya. He forged an alliance with Caracol, which had previously been a major ally of Tikal.

In 562 (9.6.7.16.2) Wak Chan K’awiil, Ajaw of Tikal, was captured and sacrificed by soldiers from Caracol during a raid directly into the city of Tikal. His death ended the reign of his dynasty in Tikal.

In 564 (9.6.9.16.12) troops from Tikal had a victory in Caracol, but it was short lived.

In 572 (9.6.18.0.14) the year Sky Witness died Tikal was defeated.

Aftermath

The political and economic implications of defeat by Calakmul had a major impact on Tikal. South of Tikal city but still in the kingdom was Mutul, Mutul actually prospered slightly from the war. Tikal remained one of the most powerful cities in Peten, even in the world, but having lost much of its importance power partially transferred to Mutul.

In 695 (9.13.2.14.19) 123 years later Tikal would turn the tables in Calakmul.

References

6th-century conflicts
Tikal-Calakmul Wars
6th century in the Maya civilization